The Pilbara ground gecko (Lucasium wombeyi) also known commonly as Wombey's gecko, is a species of lizard in the family Diplodactylidae. The species is endemic to Australia.

Etymology
The specific name, wombeyi, is in honour of Australian herpetologist John C. Wombey.

Geographic range
L. wombeyi is found in the Pilbara region, in the Australian state of Western Australia.

Habitat
The preferred natural habitats of L. wombeyi are grassland and rocky areas.

Reproduction
L. wombeyi is oviparous.

References

Further reading
Cogger HG (2014). Reptiles and Amphibians of Australia, Seventh Edition. Clayton, Victoria, Australia: CSIRO Publishing. xxx + 1,033 pp. . (Lucasium wombeyi, p. 315).
Oliver PM, Hutchinson MN, Cooper SJB (2007). "Phylogenetic relationships in the lizard genus Diplodactylus Gray and resurrection of Lucasium Wermuth (Gekkota, Diplodactylidae)". Australian Journal of Zoology 55 (3): 197–210. (Lucasium wombeyi, new combination).
Storr GM (1978). "Seven new gekkonid lizards from Western Australia". Records of the Western Australian Museum 6 (3): 337–352. (Diplodactylus wombeyi, new species, pp. 344–345, "Plate" 3).
Wilson S, Swan G (2013). A Complete Guide to Reptiles of Australia, Fourth Edition. Sydney: New Holland Publishers. 522 pp. .

Lucasium
Reptiles described in 1978
Taxa named by Glen Milton Storr
Geckos of Australia